Marcus Andrew Semien (born September 17, 1990) is an American professional baseball shortstop and second baseman for the Texas Rangers of Major League Baseball (MLB). He previously played in MLB for the Chicago White Sox, Oakland Athletics and Toronto Blue Jays.

Amateur career 
Semien grew up pitching and playing infield in El Cerrito Youth Baseball, across the bay from San Francisco, and was a member of the area's All-Star teams. He went on to attend St. Mary's College High School in Berkeley, California. At St. Mary's, he hit .471 as a junior, .371 as a senior, and was named all-league three times where he was drafted by the Chicago White Sox in the 34th round of the 2008 MLB draft.

Semien chose not to sign and instead enrolled at the University of California, Berkeley, where he played college baseball for the California Golden Bears. After struggling as a freshman, Semien improved as a sophomore, hitting .328. As a junior, Semien was the starting shortstop for the team, but hit .275, hurting his stock for the MLB Draft.

Professional career

Chicago White Sox
The White Sox selected Semien the sixth round of the 2011 MLB draft. He started his career in 2011 with the Class A Kannapolis Intimidators. He finished the 2011 season hitting .253 in 229 at-bats with, 15 doubles, two triples, three home runs, 26 runs batted in (RBIs) and three stolen bases. Semien was moved up to Class A-Advanced Winston-Salem Dash for the 2012 season. There, he hit .273 in 418 at-bats with 31 doubles, five triples, 14 home runs, 59 RBIs and 11 stolen bases. For the 2013 season, Semien was ranked the White Sox #8 prospect.

The White Sox selected Semien's contract from the Triple-A Charlotte Knights on September 3, 2013. He debuted against the New York Yankees on September 4, and recorded his first hit, a single, in his first at bat against CC Sabathia. He hit his first major league home run against J. A. Happ of the Toronto Blue Jays on September 23.

Oakland Athletics
After the 2014 season, the White Sox traded Semien, Chris Bassitt, Rangel Ravelo, and Josh Phegley to the Oakland Athletics in exchange for Jeff Samardzija and Michael Ynoa. He began the 2015 season as the team's starting shortstop. Semien struggled defensively throughout the season, committing a major-league-worst 35 errors, including a major-league-league-leading 18 throwing errors. He finished the 2015 season with a .257 AVG and fifteen home runs and eleven stolen bases. After the season, the Athletics hired Ron Washington to work with Semien on his defense.

Semien showed improvement the following season, in 2016, committing only 21 errors. He led the major leagues in assists, with 477. He showed  power at the plate, finishing second on the team in home runs with 27, as he batted .238 with ten stolen bases.

On April 17, 2017, Semien was placed on the 10-day disabled list due to a right wrist fracture, which also required surgery. For the 2017 season, he batted .249 with ten home runs and twelve stolen bases.

In 2018, he batted .255 with fifteen home runs and fourteen stolen bases. On defense he led the major leagues in assists, with 459. He was one of three finalists for a Gold Glove at shortstop in the American League, marking drastic defensive improvement from his previous seasons.

In 2019, he batted .285/.369/.522 with 33 home runs, and led the major leagues with 747 plate appearances. His performance improvements garnered him even more attention from postseason awards voters as he was named to the inaugural All-MLB second team at shortstop, finished third in voting for the American League MVP, and was again named one of three finalists for the Gold Glove.

In 53 games for the Athletics in 2020, Semien slashed .223/.305/.374 with seven home runs, nine doubles and 23 RBIs.

Toronto Blue Jays
On January 30, 2021, Semien signed a one-year, $18 million contract with the Toronto Blue Jays. On July 1, Semien was named an All-Star for the first time in his career and was named to be the starting second baseman for the AL in the 2021 All-Star Game. On September 29, Semien hit his 44th home run of the 2021 season, breaking Davey Johnson’s MLB record for the most home runs in a season by a primary second baseman. 

Semien finished the 2021 season hitting .265/.334/.538 with 45 home runs, 102 RBIs and an MLB-leading 86 extra-base hits. He finished third in American League MVP voting, behind only Shohei Ohtani and teammate Vladimir Guerrero Jr.

Texas Rangers
On December 1, 2021, Semien agreed to a seven-year, $175 million contract with the Texas Rangers.

In 2022, Semien led the major leagues in plate appearances (724) for the second straight year and at bats (657) and sacrifice flies (10; tied with Alex Bregman and Alec Bohm), and hit .248/.304/.429 with 26 home runs and 83 RBIs. He reached on an error 12 times, tops in the majors.

Personal life
Semien's mother and father also attended the University of California, Berkeley, where Semien's father, Damien, played football.

Semien and his wife have two sons together.

References

External links

1990 births
Living people
American League All-Stars
African-American baseball players
Chicago White Sox players
Oakland Athletics players
Toronto Blue Jays players
Texas Rangers players
Gold Glove Award winners
Silver Slugger Award winners
California Golden Bears baseball players
Kannapolis Intimidators players
Winston-Salem Dash players
Birmingham Barons players
Charlotte Knights players
Glendale Desert Dogs players
Major League Baseball infielders
Baseball players from San Francisco
Stockton Ports players
Nashville Sounds players
21st-century African-American sportspeople